Illinois Route 136 is an east–west state route in northwestern Illinois. It runs from the Mark Morris Memorial Bridge over the Mississippi River, connecting to Iowa Highway 136 in Clinton, Iowa, east to U.S. Route 30 east of Fulton.

Route description 

Illinois 136 is a two-lane surface road for its entire length. Route 136 begins at the Mark Morris Memorial Bridge which connects to Iowa Highway 136 in Clinton, Iowa.  At the foot of the bridge is a signal-controlled intersection with 4th Street in Fulton, which is signed as the Lincoln Highway.  Route 136 continues east along 14th Avenue, a residential street dotted by churches and businesses.  On the eastern edge of Fulton, Route 136 intersects Illinois Route 84.  The final  of Route 136, which run along Fulton Road, are part of the Lincoln Highway and are signed as such.  Route 136 ends at an intersection with U.S. Route 30.

History 
In the meantime, the Lyons–Fulton Bridge was numbered US 30 through 1957, and US 30 Alternate (US 30 Alt.) through 1967. After 1967, the bridge and road to US 30 were changed to IL 136. The spur to Flat Rock was left unnumbered.

Major intersections

References

External links 

136
136
U.S. Route 30